Work Time is an album by jazz saxophonist Sonny Rollins, recorded for the Prestige label, featuring performances by Rollins with Ray Bryant, George Morrow, and Max Roach.

Reception
The Allmusic review by Scott Yanow states: "The enjoyable outing may not be essential, but it is a strong effort."

Author and musician Peter Niklas Wilson called it "one of Rollins's most brilliant sessions. In the opinion of many of the saxophone player's fans it is the equal of the epochal Saxophone Colossus recordings."

Track listing
 "There's No Business Like Show Business" (Irving Berlin) – 6:20
 "Paradox" (Sonny Rollins) – 5:00
 "Raincheck" (Billy Strayhorn) – 6:00
 "There Are Such Things" (Stanley Adams, Abel Baer, George W. Meyer) – 9:32
 "It's All Right with Me" (Cole Porter) – 6:06

Personnel
 Sonny Rollins – tenor saxophone
 Ray Bryant – piano
 George Morrow – bass
 Max Roach – drums

References

1956 albums
Albums produced by Bob Weinstock
Albums recorded at Van Gelder Studio
Prestige Records albums
Sonny Rollins albums